George James Stuart Pitts (6 October 1878 – 27 July 1939), was a first-class cricketer.

Pitts was born in St. John's, Newfoundland, then an English colony, now part of Canada. He played two matches for Middlesex in 1914. He batted once and scored 14 runs, and as a bowler he collected 6 wickets.

External links
CricInfo

Canadian cricketers
Cricketers from Newfoundland and Labrador
1878 births
1939 deaths
Sportspeople from St. John's, Newfoundland and Labrador